The New York City Department of Homeless Services (DHS) is an agency within the government of New York City that provides services to the homeless, though its ultimate aim is to overcome homelessness. The guiding principles of the department were outlined at a 1992 New York City Commission on the Homeless: to operate an emergency shelter system for people without housing alternatives, provide services and resources to assist shelter residents in gaining independent housing, and partner with local agencies and non-profits to provide these services. Its two rules are compiled in title 31 of the New York City Rules; state regulations are primarily compiled in title 18 of the New York Codes, Rules and Regulations.

DHS programs include:
Single Adult Shelters
Adult Family Shelters
Family with Children  Shelters
Domestic Violence for victims Shelters
Veteran's Shelters
Senior Citizens Shelters
Street Homeless Solutions

History
When the department was created in 1993, New York City was the first city to have a city department that was exclusively focused on the issue of homelessness. The Department of Homeless Services  was created in response to the growing number of homeless New Yorkers and the 1981 New York Supreme Court Consent Decree that mandates the State provide shelter to all homeless people. Its first commissioner was Charles V. Raymond.  Muzzy Rosenblatt, the agency's first Chief of Staff, may have had a role in convincing Mayor David Dinkins that the homeless shelters could be run more efficiently were it a separate department from the New York City Human Resources Administration.

In 2010, the department oversaw 208 facilities with 18,616 beds and served 113,553 unique individuals. As of December, 2015, there were a total of 65,458 clients in the shelter system.   In 2015, the department's budget was $953.5 million.

In a March 2015 report of the New York City Department of Investigation (DOI) on shelters for families with children, the DOI "found that the family shelters it inspected and reviewed are too often unsafe and unhealthy for children and families". Some homeless say they are denied shelter because the shelter lacks resources for couples without children, and some say they refuse to live in shelters because they are unsafe, because of violence, theft and poor conditions.

On April 11, 2016, Mayor Bill de Blasio announced that the department would again become a part of the New York City Human Resources Administration under what he termed "a joint operating agreement.".

Picture the Homeless heavily criticized DHS's use of resources in its 2018 report, The Business of Homelessness.  The organization's recommendations included diverting funds for housing those who are homeless and most at risk of shelter entry, prioritizing capital subsidies for housing for people making as low as 10% of the area median income; semi-annual reports on shelter spending and provider performance; implementing rigorous and effective shelter inspection practices, and overhaul DHS's approach to rental assistance and housing placement. The use of funds for shelters instead of housing was also a concern when the agency was formed in 1993.

Law Enforcement
NYC DHS employ 270 special officers. They enforce State and City laws on DHS property and are responsible for safety and security inside of NYC DHS Homeless Shelters. The New York City Police Department responds to all incidents that occur at any NYC Department of Homeless Services facilities.

NYC Department of Homeless Services Police are appointed as "special officers". and as such they are recognized as peace officers under New York State Criminal Procedure Law § 2.10 subsection 27. These special officers have limited arrest powers while on duty. NYC Department of Homeless Services special officers are not armed as per NYS criminal procedure law, however all officers are equipped with Tasers, expandable batons, handcuffs, flashlight,  bullet resistant vest, pepper spray, Body Cams, Narcan and a radio that is directly linked to other officers and dispatch.

The Department of Homeless Services Police was started in 1997 assigning special officers to various DHS facilities. Currently there are 270 special officers assigned at 11 facilities.

See also
 Homelessness in the United States

References

External links
 New York City Department of Homeless Services
 Department of Homeless Services in the Rules of the City of New York
 Department of Social Services (title 18) in the New York Codes, Rules and Regulations

Homeless Services
Homelessness organizations
Homelessness in the United States
Housing in New York City